N. K. Krishnankutty, popularly known as Veloor Krishnankutty (19 September 1927 – 22 August 2003), was an Indian satirist of Malayalam literature. Kerala Sahitya Akademy awarded him their annual award for miscellaneous works in 1974.

Biography 
Veloor Krishnankutty was born on September 19, 1927 in Velur in the present day Kottayam district, then in Travancore to  N. N. Kunjunni and Parvathi Amma.

His education was at M. D. Seminary, Kottayam and CMS College Kottayam. His career started as a journalist in Deepika where he used to write a column under the pen name Pathraparayanan, and became the editor of the Deepika weekly. Later, he sat in the editorial board of Keraladhwani for eight years. He was also a member of the senate of the University of Cochin and the advisory boards of the All India Radio and the Institute of Children's Literature.

In 1973, one of his books, Masappady Mathupillai was adapted into a film under the same name and he wrote the dialogues. Noted filmmaker, K. G. George based his 1984 satire Panchavadi Palam on a book of Krishnankutty of the same name and two years later, he wrote the story, screenplay and dialogues for Ambili Ammavan. His book, Vela Manasilirikkatte, fetched Krishnankutty the Kerala Sahitya Akademi Award for Miscellaneous Works in 1974. He was also a recipient of other honours including E. V. Krishna Pillai Memorial Janma Satabdi Award and K. Karunakaran Memorial Seva Sangham Award.

He died on August 22, 2003 at a private hospital in Kottayam where he had been admitted following renal complaints, survived his wife, two daughters and a son.

Books

Awards

See also 
 List of Malayalam-language authors

References

External links 
 
 
 

1936 births
2003 deaths
Indian satirists
Journalists from Kerala
Malayalam-language writers
Malayalam literary critics
Recipients of the Kerala Sahitya Akademi Award
20th-century Indian dramatists and playwrights
20th-century Indian essayists
20th-century Indian short story writers
Dramatists and playwrights from Kerala
20th-century Indian male writers